"Let's Go" is a song written and performed by Scottish DJ Calvin Harris, featuring vocals from American singer Ne-Yo. The track was released in the United Kingdom on 30 March 2012 as the third single from Harris' third studio album, 18 Months (2012). On 29 April 2012, precisely a week after its release, "Let's Go" debuted at number two on the UK Singles Chart for the week ending dated 5 May 2012— marking Harris' third consecutive number two hit (held off by Carly Rae Jepsen's song "Call Me Maybe"). As of July 2012, the song has sold 376,000 downloads in the United States. It also appeared on the deluxe version of Ne-Yo's fifth studio album, R.E.D. The song received a nomination for Best Dance Recording at the 55th Grammy Awards held in February 2013.

The song was used for a Pepsi and Pepsi Max advert that features Lionel Messi, Didier Drogba, Fernando Torres, Wojciech Szczęsny, Frank Lampard, Sergio Agüero and Jack Wilshere. It was also used as the opening track to the London New Year’s Eve fireworks display for 2019–20. The Los Angeles Dodgers use this song when they hit a Home run

Critical reception
Lewis Corner of Digital Spy gave the song a positive review stating:

"It's not about what you've done, it's about what you're doing," he aptly states over Calvin's unmistakable electronic flourishes of euphoric synths and speaker-jumping beats, which happens to soundtrack an impressive footballer-starring Pepsi Max ad campaign. Coincidentally, the final result isn't too different from the fizzy beverage; it's sparkling, addictive and sure to give you a burst of energy. .

Music video
The music video was released on 14 May 2012 on Vevo. It begins with the people all around the world doing something and also exciting things before one of them goes to the club where Harris is seen DJing the party. Ne-Yo also appears boxing at a gym and in the back seat in the car singing the song.

Live performances
Ne-Yo performed "Let's Go" at the 2013 NBA All-Star Game, also incorporating Janet Jackson's "I Get Lonely" into the song. He also performed it at 1st Indonesian Choice Awards.

Track listing

Charts and certifications

Weekly charts

Year-end charts

Certifications

Release history

References

2012 singles
Calvin Harris songs
Ne-Yo songs
Songs written by Ne-Yo
Songs written by Calvin Harris
2012 songs
Columbia Records singles